Louisville (/ˈluːɪsvɪl/) is a city in Stark County, Ohio, United States. The population was 9,521 at the time of the 2020 census.

History
On October 8, 1834, Louisville was formally settled by Henry Lautzenheiser, from Germany, and Henry Fainot, a French Huguenot. The city was named after Lautzenheiser's son, Lewis, and called Lewisville, Ohio. The name of the town was also considered appropriate because it was initially surveyed by the similar-sounding name of Lewis Vail. When the post office was established in 1837, with Sam Petree as its first postmaster, it was discovered Ohio already had a Lewisville, so the spelling was changed to Louisville.

Within Louisville's early days, the town competed with the fellow Nimishillen Township community of Harrisburg (also known as Barryville) for growth. Harrisburg initially flourished due to its accessibility as a stagecoach stop between Canton, Alliance, Cleveland, and Pittsburgh. Meanwhile, Louisville also grew, due to its location upon the east branch of the Nimishillen Creek, which flows toward Canton. However, when the Pittsburgh, Fort Wayne and Chicago Railway was laid through Louisville in 1852, Louisville began to grow more quickly than Harrisburg, which struggled with the difficulty of hauling its main product, wheat, by barge. Today, Harrisburg is now an unincorporated community, marked only by a handful of businesses and a Roman Catholic parish.

On April 1, 1872, Louisville was officially incorporated as a village, with George Violand elected as Louisville's first mayor. By the late 19th Century, Louisville contained many quickly growing businesses, including: a plow manufacturing company, a wooden mill, a brewery, a basket factory, flour mills, tanneries, a brick yard, two hotels, a shoe factory, and a number of taverns/saloons (Louisville had twenty saloons at one point, giving the town a rather notorious reputation). Two of these businesses, Star Mill and the Town Tavern, remain open to this day. Furthermore, many of the buildings constructed within Louisville during this time period are listed upon the National Register of Historic Places. Such locations include Saint Louis Catholic Church, which was completed in 1870 and dedicated in 1878, and the city's historic downtown district, roughly bordered by Chapel Street, Lincoln Court, St. Louis Court, Nickelplate Street, East Gorgas Street, and Center Court. The city's current weekly newspaper, The Louisville Herald, was first published in 1887. For a brief time, the town also had a Roman Catholic college, established by the Reverend Louis Hoffer, located across the street from St. Louis Church. Called Saint Louis College, it opened in 1866 under the operation of the Diocese of Cleveland. The Congregation of St. Basil of Toronto assumed control of the college the following year, and Saint Louis College closed in 1873, due to lack of funds and transportation difficulties for the students. After briefly serving as an all-girls academy and a school for deaf mutes, The building became an orphanage under the guidance of the Vincentian Sisters of Charity. The Saint Louis Orphan Asylum closed in 1925, and became a hospice for the elderly, named St. Joseph's, in 1927. The old red brick building was razed in 1975, as St. Joseph's moved across the street from St. Thomas Aquinas High School. A McDonald's is now located upon the site.

The early 1880s saw the arrival of telephone toll lines to Louisville. Louisville's first public street lights, twelve oil burners, were lit downtown for Christmas 1884. In 1894, a public water system was established for Louisville, and a sewage system installation followed in 1910. The town's Main Street became Louisville's first fully paved road in 1914. In 1960, Louisville's residents voted for the village to become a city.

Constitution Town 
Louisville is also known as the "Constitution Town." This is due to the fact that a resident of Louisville, Olga T. Weber petitioned for the establishment of Constitution Day for the United States in 1952. Her lobbying led to the Ohio General Assembly proclaiming September 17 as a statewide "Constitution Day," under a law signed by then-governor Frank J. Lausche. The following year, Weber urged the United States Senate to declare the week of September 17–23 as "Constitution Week". Her request was approved by both the Senate and the United States House of Representatives, and signed into law by President Dwight D. Eisenhower. On April 15, 1957, Louisville's City Council officially declared itself "The Constitution Town." The city continues to hold a "Constitution Week" celebration annually during the week of September 17.

Geography
The east branch of Nimishillen Creek flows through the city.

Demographics

2010 census
As of the census of 2010, there were 9,186 people, 3,727 households, and 2,498 families residing in the city. The racial makeup of the city was 98.3% White, 0.2% African American, 0.2% Native American, 0.3% Asian, 0.2% from other races, and 0.9% from two or more races. Hispanic or Latino of any race were 1.3% of the population.

There were 3,727 households, of which 33.9% had children under the age of 18 living with them, 49.4% were married couples living together, 13.3% had a female householder with no husband present, 4.4% had a male householder with no wife present, and 33.0% were non-families. 28.0% of all households were made up of individuals, and 15.4% had someone living alone who was 65 years of age or older. The average household size was 2.44 and the average family size was 2.99.

The median age in the city was 39.4 years. 25.4% of residents were under the age of 18; 7.4% were between the ages of 18 and 24; 24.7% were from 25 to 44; 24.5% were from 45 to 64; and 18% were 65 years of age or older. The gender makeup of the city was 46.5% male and 53.5% female.

2000 census
As of the census of 2000, there were 8,904 people, 3,444 households, and 2,465 families residing in the city. The population density was 1,726.6 people per square mile (666.3/km). There were 3,544 housing units at an average density of 687.2 per square mile (265.2/km). The racial makeup of the city was 98.53% White, 0.31% African American, 0.15% Native American, 0.29% Asian, 0.07% from other races, and 0.65% from two or more races. Hispanic or Latino of any race were 0.83% of the population.

There were 3,444 households, out of which 35.5% had children under the age of 18 living with them, 56.6% were married couples living together, 11.5% had a female householder with no husband present, and 28.4% were non-families. 24.2% of all households were made up of individuals, and 10.6% had someone living alone who was 65 years of age or older. The average household size was 2.54 and the average family size was 3.03.

In the city the age distribution of the population shows 27.1% under the age of 18, 7.5% from 18 to 24, 29.7% from 25 to 44, 20.6% from 45 to 64, and 15.2% who were 65 years of age or older. The median age was 36 years. For every 100 females, there were 88.7 males. For every 100 females age 18 and over, there were 84.7 males.

The median income for a household in the city was $41,490, and the median income for a family was $49,844. Males had a median income of $37,625 versus $22,398 for females. The per capita income for the city was $20,783. About 3.1% of families and 4.0% of the population were below the poverty line, including 4.5% of those under age 18 and 6.9% of those age 65 or over.

Education

Public schools
Louisville, as well as the majority of the surrounding Nimishillen Township, is served by the Louisville City School District, composed of Louisville High School, Louisville Middle School, Louisville Elementary School and North Nimishillen Elementary School.

Private schools
St. Thomas Aquinas High School/Middle School and the Holy Cross Academy at Saint Louis Campus are located within the city of Louisville. Saint Louis School opened its doors in 1924. It served Grades Kindergarten through Eighth until the 2013–2014 school year, and enrolled students for Grades PreK-5th from 2014 to 2019. Saint Louis School closed after the 2018–2019 school year due to declining enrollment. St. Thomas Aquinas High School opened in 1964. In 2014, it added a Middle School program to serve Grades 6–8.

Notable people
 Augustus D. Juilliard, philanthropist. A Juilliard Arts Center established in his honor is located within Louisville. 
 Edward Julien Moinet, United States Federal Court judge
 Joseph Gabriel Harner, US Navy, Medal of Honor at United States occupation of Veracruz in 1914.
 Pat Rebillot, jazz pianist.
 Olga T. Weber, activist who sought the recognition of Constitution Day and Constitution Week in Ohio and the United States. Also known for her idea to make March 1 Ohio Statehood Day.

References

External links

 City website
 Louisville Area Chamber of Commerce

Cities in Stark County, Ohio
French-American culture in Ohio
German-American culture in Ohio
Populated places established in 1834
1834 establishments in Ohio
Cities in Ohio